Susanne Liberg Amundsen (born 20 August 2002) is a Norwegian handball player for Storhamar HE.

On 26 September 2022, Amundsen was selected to be a part of the extended squad for the 2022 European Women's Handball Championship.

Achievements
Junior World Championship:
Gold Medalist: 2022
REMA 1000-ligaen:
Silver: 2020/2021, 2021/2022

References

2002 births
Living people
Sportspeople from Hamar
Norwegian female handball players